Gangchang Station is a station of the Daegu Metro Line 2 in Hosan-dong, Dalseo District, Daegu, South Korea.

Origin of the name 
Gangchang(강창, 江倉), a warehouse built to store and transport rice by boat, was established along the Nakdong River near Gangchang Bridge in Hosan-dong, Paho-dong. And the area is still called Gangchang.

References

External links 
  Cyber station information from Daegu Metropolitan Transit Corporation

Daegu Metro stations
Dalseo District
Railway stations opened in 2005